Royal Air Force Dalton or more simply RAF Dalton is a former Royal Air Force satellite station located near to Dalton, North Yorkshire, England.

The airfield was by RAF Bomber Command during the Second World War. It was a satellite of nearby RAF Topcliffe.

History

RAF Dalton was home to No. 102 Squadron beginning in November 1941. No. 102 Squadron returned to Topcliffe in June 1942 and for a time Dalton hosted No. 1652 Heavy Conversion Unit RAF (HCU) flying Handley Page Halifaxes. The airfield was improved in 1942 and in early 1943 was allocated to No. 6 Group Royal Canadian Air Force (RCAF). Canadian squadrons stationed here at one time or another included No. 428 Squadron, No. 424 Squadron, No. 420 Squadron, and No. 1666 Heavy Conversion Unit RAF (which moved to RAF Wombleton in October 1943). The station also housed No. 1691 Bomber Gunnery Flight RCAF and its successor, No. 1695 Bomber Defence Training Flight RCAF, the last RCAF unit to serve at this station.

In November 1944, control passed from No. 6 Group to the new No. 7 (Training) Group. By August 1945 all units at Dalton were disbanded or transferred.

Operational units and aircraft

Current use
The aerodrome facilities are now being used for commercial and industrial uses. A major employer on the estate is Severfield plc.

References

Citations

Bibliography

External links
 RAF Dalton, Yorkshire on airfields.fotopic.net
 RAF Dalton on wikimapia (zoom in for best result)

Royal Air Force stations in Yorkshire
Royal Air Force stations of World War II in the United Kingdom
History of North Yorkshire
Military history of Yorkshire
Military history of North Yorkshire